Mark Shipway (born 3 May 1976 in Australia) is a former professional rugby league footballer who played for the North Queensland Cowboys, the Northern Eagles and the Manly-Warringah Sea Eagles in the National Rugby League (NRL). He also played for the Salford City Reds in the Super League and for the Redcliffe Dolphins in the Queensland Cup.

Playing career
Shipway made his professional debut for the North Queensland Cowboys in the Australian Super League in round 2 of the 1997 season against the Western Reds. Shipway played a further four more seasons for the Cowboys in the National Rugby League; the competition formed following the Super League War. Shipway then joined the Northern Eagles and played for the club in its last ever game, a 68–28 loss to Penrith in which Shipway scored a try.  

The following year, the Northern Eagles reformed itself as the Manly-Warringah Sea Eagles after which he played one further year for the club before leaving for a two-year stint in the Super League.

Shipway had originally joined the Cowboys after several years playing in the Queensland Cup (formerly known as the BRL Cup) for the Redcliffe Dolphins. He made his debut for Redcliffe in 1996 but had joined them a season earlier as a colt. He won a premiership in 1996 and also in 2006 with Redcliffe, after returning to the Queensland Cup outfit following his two-year stint at the Salford City Reds in the Super League.

References

1976 births
Living people
Australian rugby league players
Manly Warringah Sea Eagles players
North Queensland Cowboys players
Northern Eagles players
Salford Red Devils players
Rugby league centres
Rugby league second-rows